Agustín Emiliano Navarro Báez (born 26 April 1997) is a Uruguayan footballer who plays as a forward for Sud America in the Liga de Uruguay.

References

1997 births
Living people
Uruguayan footballers
Uruguayan expatriate footballers
Danubio F.C. players
Sud América players
Juventud de Las Piedras players
San Marcos de Arica footballers
Uruguayan Primera División players
Uruguayan Segunda División players
Primera B de Chile players
Association football forwards
Footballers from Montevideo
Uruguayan expatriate sportspeople in Chile
Expatriate footballers in Chile